Auguste Schlüter (27 June 1849 – Autumn 1917) was a German Empire domestic servant and biographer. Her memoirs were titled A Lady's Maid in Downing Street.

Biography
Auguste Schlüter was born in the Kingdom of Hanover, 27 June 1849. Her life changed when she was seventeen as she was in England where she was employed by the politician and Prime Minister William and Catherine Gladstone. Schlüter did not speak much English but she decided to keep a diary as she worked as a maid looking after two of her employer's daughters, Mary and Helen Gladstone.

She published her memoirs as A Lady's Maid in Downing Street. The book gives an interesting view of upper class life although critics observed that Schlüter was living at the centre of government but only small details of world events made it into her book. One source says that the memoirs were published in 1884 whilst another says 1919. 1885 was an important year as Mary Gladstone married and she became Catherine Gladstone's maid until 1890. In 1890 she was required more in Hanover where her mother needed her support. However she remained in contact with the Gladstone family even through the difficulties of communication during the first world war.

Schlüter died in Hanover at the end of 1917.

References 

1849 births
1917 deaths
People from the Kingdom of Hanover
German women writers
German memoirists
German domestic workers
Women memoirists